Palaw  is a town in the Tanintharyi Division, Myanmar.

External links
Satellite map of Palaw and environs from Google Maps

Township capitals of Myanmar
Populated places in Tanintharyi Region